The Senegal thick-knee (Burhinus senegalensis) is a stone-curlew, a group of waders in the family Burhinidae. Their vernacular scientific name refers to the prominent joints in the long yellow or greenish legs.

Range
It is a resident breeder in Africa between the Sahara and the equator, and in the Nile valley.

Description

Senegal thick-knees are medium-large waders with strong black and yellow black bills, large yellow eyes — which give them a reptilian appearance — and cryptic plumage. They are similar but slightly smaller than the Eurasian stone-curlew, which winters in Africa. The long dark bill, single black bar on the folded wing, and darker cheek stripe are distinctions from the European species. Senegal thick-knee is striking in flight, with a broad white wing bar.

Habits and food

This species has a preference for dry open habitats with some bare ground, preferably near water. It lays two blotchy light brown eggs on a ground scrape. It is most active at dawn and dusk. The song is a loud pi-pi-pi-pi-pi-pi-pi.

Food is insects, crustaceans and other invertebrates. It will also take other small prey.

References

Further reading
The field characters of this species and its separation from Eurasian stone-curlew are described in:
 Shirihai, Hadoram (1994) Field characters of Senegal Thick-knee British Birds 87(4):183-186

External links
 Senegal thick-knee videos, photos & sounds on the Internet Bird Collection
 https://www.flickr.com/photos/likifumei/542653503

Senegal thick-knee
Birds of Sub-Saharan Africa
Senegal thick-knee
Taxa named by William John Swainson